Alcocer is a surname. Notable people with the surname include:

Alberto Alcocer (born 1942), Spanish businessman
Alberto Alcocer y Ribacoba (1886–1957), Spanish politician
Alejandro González Alcocer (born 1951), Mexican politician
Eduardo Quian Alcocer (born 1967), Mexican politician
Érika Alcocer Luna (born 1974), Mexican singer
Ignacio Alcocer (1870–1936), Mexican politician
Jorge Alcocer Varela, Mexican healthcare professional
José Miguel Guridi y Alcocer (1763–1828), Spanish-Mexican politician
Juan Alcocer Flores (born 1955), Mexican politician
Mariano Palacios Alcocer (born 1952), Mexican politician
Máximo Alcócer (1933–2014), Bolivian footballer 
Raúl Molina Alcocer (born 1976), Spanish footballer
Teresa Alcocer y Gasca (born 1952), Mexican politician
Víctor Alcocer (1917–1984), Mexican actor